Aawatif Hayar is the Moroccan Minister of Solidarity, Social Integration and the Family. She was appointed as Minister on 7 October 2021.

Education 
Hayar holds a Master in Electrical Engineering (1992) from the École normale supérieure Paris-Saclay and a PhD in Signal Processing and Telecommunications (2001) from the National Polytechnic Institute of Toulouse.

References 

Living people
21st-century Moroccan politicians
École Normale Supérieure alumni
Moroccan politicians
University of Toulouse alumni
Women government ministers of Morocco
Year of birth missing (living people)